Agaricus litoralis, also known as the coastal mushroom, is a species of mushroom in the genus Agaricus. It was first described by Wakefield and A. Pearson as Psalliota litoralis in 1946. 

It occurs throughout Europe including Scandinavia and Great Britain. While it may be quite common locally, such as on Öland island, it is rarely found in most areas except for southern Europe. Its conservation status in Sweden is "near threatened".

Description
The cap is often depressed when older and rests of the annulus may occur on the outer rim. While rose-coloured at a young age, the gills become dark brown as the mushroom grows older. It is often remarkably shorter than the cap is wide. The spores are dark brown and egg-shaped. The mushroom is saprotrophic, i.e. it feeds on decaying matter. It prefers herbaceous dry grasslands, heaths and steppe.

References

litoralis
Fungi of Europe